Duffel is a municipality in the Belgian province of Antwerp.

The municipality comprises the town of Duffel proper. On 1 January 2020, Duffel had a total population of 17,664. The total area is 22.71 km² which gives a population density of 778 inhabitants per km².

The area is name-giver to a coarse woolen cloth, manufactured in this area from the 11th century, mainly used to make blankets, outdoor (army) coats, and tote bags. Duffel became a household name during and after World War II in the meaning of a coat designed with toggle-and-loop fastening and roomy hood.

The etymology of Duffel is from "dubro" and "locus", from the Gaulish dubrum, dubron – "water".

In 1836, the Duffel railway station opened on the Brussels-North to Antwerp railway line.

Duffel cloth
The town gives its name to a type of heavy woolen cloth generally used to make blankets and overcoats, especially for the armed forces, and a type of luggage. In the middle ages, an important part of the region's industry was the manufacturing of Flemish laken (a broadcloth), while the cloth produced in Duffel was a thicker variation. The manufacturing process was brought to England by Flemish emigrants in the 1500s. The name for the cloth was so well-known that a type of overcoat made from the cloth and manufactured in England got the name Duffel coat.

Notable natives 
Jan Van Der Roost, composer
Kevin De Weert, cyclist
Andreas Pereira, footballer
Metejoor, singer
Cornelis Kiliaan (1528–1607), lexicographer and poet
Hendrik Hondius I (1573–1650), engraver, cartographer and publisher
Rocky Bushiri, footballer for Hibernian FC

Climate

Gallery

See also
Duffel coat
Duffel bag

References

External links 
 
 

Municipalities of Antwerp Province
Populated places in Antwerp Province